Jerry McCord Van Dyke (July 27, 1931 – January 5, 2018) was an American actor and comedian. He was the younger brother of Dick Van Dyke.

Van Dyke had a long and successful career mostly as a character actor in supporting and guest roles on popular television series. He made his television acting debut on The Dick Van Dyke Show with several guest appearances as Rob Petrie's brother, Stacey.  From 1989 to 1997, he played Luther Van Dam on the popular series Coach.

Early life
Jerry McCord Van Dyke was born in Danville, Illinois on July 27, 1931, to Hazel Victoria (née McCord), a stenographer, and Loren Wayne "Cookie" Van Dyke, a salesman. He was of Dutch, English, Irish, and Scottish descent.

Career

Early career

Van Dyke pursued a stand-up comedy career while still in Danville High School and was already a veteran of strip joints and nightclubs when he joined the United States Air Force Tops In Blue in 1954 and 1955. During the mid-1950s, Van Dyke worked at WTHI-TV in Terre Haute, Indiana. The Jerry Van Dyke Show, which included future CBS News Early Show news anchor Joseph Benti, Nancee South and Ben Falber, was popular fare. In the service, he performed at military bases around the world, twice winning the All Air Force Talent Show.

Following his first guest appearances on The Dick Van Dyke Show and two others on CBS's The Ed Sullivan Show, CBS made him a regular on The Judy Garland Show. He was also given hosting chores on the 1963 game show Picture This. In that same year, movie audiences saw him in supporting roles in McLintock!, Palm Springs Weekend and The Courtship of Eddie's Father.

Television career

In 1963 Van Dyke was cast on an episode of GE True, hosted by Jack Webb. When The Judy Garland Show was unsuccessfully revamped, Van Dyke left the program. He turned down the offer to play Gilligan on Gilligan's Island, a role which instead went to Bob Denver. It is uncertain whether he was considered to replace Don Knotts as Sheriff Andy Taylor's deputy on The Andy Griffith Show, although he did appear as a guest star in one episode. He also appeared in a 1964 episode of The Cara Williams Show. Van Dyke finally accepted the lead role of attorney David Crabtree in My Mother the Car (1965), the misadventures of a man whose deceased mother Gladys (voiced by Ann Sothern) is reincarnated as a restored antique car. Though the series was a commercial failure, Van Dyke continued to work steadily in supporting television and film roles through the rest of the decade. He starred in another short-lived situation comedy Accidental Family (1967) as widowed comedian Jerry Webster who buys a farm to raise his son while he is not away on professional tours. Well received by critics, Van Dyke was upset when the show was sandwiched between the poorly-rated Star Trek and filler documentaries on Friday nights, leading to the show's failure.

He was also featured in Love and Kisses (1965) and as Andy Griffith's co-star in Angel in My Pocket (1969).

During the 1970s, Van Dyke returned to stand-up comedy. He spent much of the decade touring Playboy Clubs around the country and headlining venues in Las Vegas and Reno, Nevada, Summerfest in Milwaukee, and in Atlantic City, New Jersey. He returned to television for guest appearances on Love, American Style and Fantasy Island. In 1973 he portrayed Wes Callison, Children's Comedy Writer, on the season three episode "But Seriously, Folks" on The Mary Tyler Moore Show. He also had roles in The Amazing Cosmic Awareness of Duffy Moon (1976) and 13 Queens Boulevard (1979). Also in 1989 he appeared as a panelist in the pilot for the revival of Match Game, hosted by Bert Convy.

In 1988, Van Dyke made a guest appearance on Scott Baio's sitcom Charles in Charge as Jamie Powell's health teacher Mr. Merkin. In 1989, he began portraying beloved, yet befuddled, assistant coach Luther Van Dam on the long-running series Coach. For this role, Van Dyke received four consecutive Emmy Award nominations (1990 through 1993) for "Outstanding Supporting Actor in a Comedy Series".

Later career
In 1995, Van Dyke appeared in a series of Hardee's commercials to promote the Big Hardee, then in the late 1990s acted as the spokesperson for Big Lots. He had a recurring role on Yes, Dear as Big Jimmy, the father of Jimmy Hughes. He made a guest appearance on a September 2008 episode of My Name Is Earl and in 2010 he made an appearance on the second-season episode, "A Simple Christmas" of the television series, The Middle, playing Frankie's father, Tag Spence. He returned in "Thanksgiving III" in November 2011, "Thanksgiving IV" in November 2012, "From Orson with Love" in May 2013, "Thanksgiving V" in November 2013. and "Flirting with disaster" in March 2015. Van Dyke also played the object of Maw Maw's affections on the 18th episode of the first season of Raising Hope. In a December 2013 episode of The Millers he played Bud Miller, father to Margo Martindale's character, Carol. In his final television role in April 2015, he reprised his role as Frankie's father on The Middle, along with real-life brother Dick Van Dyke playing his character's brother.

Personal life
Van Dyke was married twice and had three children with first wife Carol: Jerri Lynn, Kelly Jean, and Ronald. Kelly Jean died by suicide in 1991, following struggles with substance abuse.

Jerry and his second wife, Shirley, lived on an 800-acre ranch near Hot Springs, Arkansas.

Van Dyke was an avid poker player and announced a number of poker tournaments for ESPN in the late 1990s and early 2000s. He was also a four-string banjo player with several performances on The Dick Van Dyke Show to his credit.

Death
On January 5, 2018, Van Dyke died at his Hot Spring County, Arkansas ranch from heart failure at the age of 86. He was in declining health subsequent to a car accident two years earlier.

Filmography

Film

Television

References

External links

 

1931 births
2018 deaths
20th-century American male actors
21st-century American male actors
American banjoists
American male film actors
American male television actors
American people of Dutch descent
American people of English descent
American people of Irish descent
American people of Scottish descent
Male actors from Illinois
Male actors from Arkansas
Military personnel from Illinois
People from Danville, Illinois
People from Hot Spring County, Arkansas
Poker commentators
United States Air Force airmen
Jerry